Nodular parenchyma is a small mass of tissue within a gland or organ that carries out the specialized functions of the gland or organ.

External links 
 Nodular parenchyma entry in the public domain NCI Dictionary of Cancer Terms

Tissues (biology)